Mozaffari (also Romanized as Moz̧affarī; also known as Muzaffari) is a village in Sofla Rural District, in the Central District of Kharameh County, Fars Province, Iran. At the 2006 census, its population was 440, in 109 families.

References 

Populated places in Kharameh County